Philip Seymour Hoffman was an American actor of the stage and screen.

He received an Academy Award, British Academy Award, Golden Globe Award, and Screen Actors Guild Award for his performance as Truman Capote in Bennett Miller's film Capote (2005). 
He received two more Academy Award nominations for his performances in Mike Nichols' Charlie Wilson's War (2007), John Patrick Shanley's Doubt (2008), and Paul Thomas Anderson's The Master (2012).

He received three Tony Award nominations for his work on the Broadway stage for his performances in Sam Shepard's True West, Eugene O'Neill's Long Day's Journey into Night, and Arthur Miller's Death of a Salesman.

Major associations

Academy Awards
Hoffman won one Academy Award from 4 nominations.

British Academy Film Awards
Hoffman was nominated five times, and won once.

Emmy Awards
Hoffman was nominated for one Primetime Emmy, and one Daytime Emmy.

Golden Globe Awards
Hoffman won one Golden Globe Award from five nominations.

Screen Actors Guild Awards
Hoffman was nominated nine times and won one Screen Actors Guild Award.

Tony Awards
Hoffman was nominated three times.

Film critic awards

Miscellaneous awards

Theatre awards

Drama Desk Awards
Hoffman was nominated seven times.

Miscellaneous awards
Hoffman received one Theatre World Award, was nominated for two Lucille Lortel Awards.

References

External links
 Philip Seymour Hoffman awards at The New York Times

Hoffman, Philip Seymour
Awards